Force Gurkha is an compact SUV produced by Indian manufacturer Force Motors. 

The original and second generation Gurkha are produced as two-door trucks with options of a removable hard or soft top.

Standard equipment includes mechanical differential locks for the front and rear axles, a snorkel that allows it to drive through water 550mm deep, and a transfer case with low-ratios.

History

First series (2008–2013) 
The First series of Gurkha variant was fitted with a 2.6-litre, intercooled Mercedes-Benz OM616 diesel engine, which comes with a displacement capacity of 2596cc.

Second series (2013–2017) 
The second series of Gurkha variant  was fitted with a 2.6-litre, intercooled diesel engine, which comes with a displacement capacity of 2596cc. It was compliant with Bharat Stage III (BS3) emission standard and incorporated with a turbocharger. It enables the engine to churn out a maximum power of 80.4bhp at 3200rpm in combination with a peak torque output of 230Nm between 1800 to 2000rpm. It is integrated with four cylinders and sixteen valves using double overhead camshaft based valve configuration. This power plant is integrated with a direct injection fuel supply system that helps in delivering 15 Kmpl approximately on the highways and about 10.5 Kmpl in the city traffic conditions. This diesel motor is skillfully coupled with a five speed manual transmission gear box, which helps it in attaining a top speed in the range of 130 to 140 Km/h. At the same time, it can cross the speed barrier of 100 Kmph in close to 17 seconds from a standstill.

Third series (2017–2021) 
The third series of Gurkha is available in three different variants Xplorer, Xpedition and the Xtreme. Comes with a new BS-IV compliant engine in addition to a host of changes. The off-roader can be ordered in both soft-top and hardtop versions, while you get sturdy bits like a steel bumper with foglamps as well as a factory fitted snorkel intake for better water wading capabilities.

Fourth series (2021–present) 
Force has launched the new-gen Gurkha and in October 2021. It will priced from Rs 12.99 lakh onwards (ex-showroom). It is mostly going to get a 90PS 2.6-litre diesel engine with a 5-speed manual gearbox. The cabin of the Force Gurkha has been revamped with an all-black theme with rear captain seats and jump seats in the boot. It will further feature LED headlamps with DRLs, power windows, dual front airbags, ABS with EBD, an aftermarket touchscreen infotainment system, tyre pressure monitoring, rear wiper, optional alloy wheels and rear parking sensors.

References

External links
 Force Gurkha Official Website

Gurkha
Force Motors Gurkha
Force Motors Gurkha
Cars introduced in 2008